Garrett Scott (born November 14, 1991) is a former American football offensive tackle. He was drafted by the Seattle Seahawks in the sixth round of the 2014 NFL Draft. He played college football at Marshall.

Professional career

2014 NFL Draft
Scott was selected with the 199th overall pick in the 6th round of the 2014 NFL Draft by the Seattle Seahawks.

Seattle Seahawks
On May 22, 2014, Scott signed a rookie contract with the Seahawks. However, he was released the next day as a result of a rare heart condition. Despite being cut by the Seahawks, Scott was still paid his $100,000 signing bonus in full.

References

External links
Marshall Thundering Herd bio 

1991 births
Living people
People from Douglas, Georgia
Players of American football from Georgia (U.S. state)
American football offensive tackles
Marshall Thundering Herd football players
Seattle Seahawks players